Martina Deignan (born in East Orange, New Jersey) is an American actress. She played Jackie Parks on NBC's soap opera Santa Barbara from January to May 1985. Prior to joining the show, Martina had a starring role as the fifth Dr. Annie Stewart Ward on As the World Turns from 1976 to 1979.

In 1981–1982, Martina starred in Code Red as Haley Green, a young female firefighter in the Los Angeles City Fire Department. The show lasted one season. She was also featured in the 1990 film Ghost, portraying Rose, secretary to Patrick Swayze's character.

External links 
 

Year of birth missing (living people)
Living people
American television actresses
American soap opera actresses
Actresses from New Jersey
Actors from East Orange, New Jersey